Yaowarat Chinatown Heritage Center or Wat Traimit Museum (พิพิธภัณฑ์วัดไตรมิตร) is a museum in Talat Noi Subdistrict, Samphanthawong District, Bangkok, Thailand. The museum focuses on the history of early Chinese immigrants in Siam (Thailand in present), especially in the area of Sampheng or popularly known as Yaowarat (Chinatown).

The museum is open daily except Mondays from 09.00 am to 05.00 pm, admission fee is 40 baht each, free for Thais.

References

Museums in Bangkok
Samphanthawong district